Ski jumping at the 2013 European Youth Olympic Winter Festival was held in Râșnov, Romania at the Valea Cărbunării Ski Jumping Hill in the Râșnov Sports Complex from 18 to 22 February 2013.

Results

Medal table

Men's events

Ladies events

Mixed events

References

External links
Results
The Venue at EYOWF 2013 | Photo Gallery
Valea Cărbunării Ski Jumping Hill at Skisprungschanzen
Râșnov Sports Complex at Facebook
EYOWF 2013 - Presentation Video at YouTube
EYOWF 2013 - Facilities Presentation at YouTube

2013 in ski jumping
2013 European Youth Olympic Winter Festival events
2013